The European Film Award for Best Supporting Actress was awarded by the European Film Academy to actress of European language films.

Winners and nominees

See also
 BAFTA Award for Best Actress in a Supporting Role
 César Award for Best Supporting Actress
 David di Donatello for Best Supporting Actress
 Goya Award for Best Supporting Actress
 Polish Academy Award for Best Supporting Actress

External links
European Film Academy archive

Film awards for supporting actress
Awards established in 1988
1988 establishments in Europe
Best Supporting Actress